William N. Dunn (August 17, 1938 – May 16, 2022) was an American scholar and professor of international relations at University of Pittsburgh. He is known for his research on public policy and public administration. Dunn was a recipient of Aaron Wildavsky Award and Jeffrey Pressman Award from Policy Studies Organization.

Books
 Public Policy Analysis, William N Dunn, Edition 5 (revised), Taylor & Francis, 2015,

References

External links
William N. Dunn

1938 births
2022 deaths
University of Pittsburgh faculty
Claremont Graduate University alumni
University of California, Santa Barbara alumni
American political scientists